Edmond Augustus Edmondson (April 7, 1919 – December 8, 1990) was an American World War II veteran, lawyer, and politician from Oklahoma. He served 10 terms in the U.S. House of Representatives from 1953 to 1973. He was defeated in U.S. Senate elections in Oklahoma three times in 1972, 1974, and 1978.

Early life
He was born and raised in Muskogee, Oklahoma, where he attended public school before going on to attend Muskogee Junior College. Following graduation from the University of Oklahoma in 1940, he joined the Federal Bureau of Investigation, serving as a special agent until 1943. From 1943 to 1946, he served in the United States Navy and continued in the reserves until 1970. He earned a law degree from Georgetown University Law Center in 1947.

Political career
He served in the U.S. House of Representatives from 1953 to 1973. In the 1972 election, he was a candidate for the U.S. Senate, but narrowly lost the general election to former Oklahoma Governor Dewey F. Bartlett.

Edmondson did not sign the 1956 Southern Manifesto, and voted in favor of the Civil Rights Acts of 1957, 1960, 1964, and 1968, as well as the 24th Amendment to the U.S. Constitution and the Voting Rights Act of 1965.

In the 1974 election, he ran for the state's other U.S. Senate seat, losing to incumbent Henry Bellmon by less than 1 percent of the vote. In the 1978 election, he made a surprise late entry in the U.S. Senate race, losing the Democratic primary runoff to popular Governor David Boren by a wide margin.

Family
He and his wife June had five children, including their sons, Oklahoma Supreme Court Justice James E. Edmondson, and former Oklahoma Attorney General Drew Edmondson. His brother was J. Howard Edmondson, a former Governor of Oklahoma and U.S. Senator.

Death and legacy 
He died in Muskogee, Oklahoma on December 8, 1990. 

In 2003, the federal courthouse in Muskogee was renamed the Ed Edmondson United States Courthouse in his honor.

References

External links

1919 births
1990 deaths
Candidates in the 1972 United States elections
Candidates in the 1974 United States elections
Candidates in the 1978 United States elections
Federal Bureau of Investigation agents
United States Navy reservists
Georgetown University Law Center alumni
University of Oklahoma alumni
Politicians from Muskogee, Oklahoma
Military personnel from Oklahoma
Edmondson family
Democratic Party members of the United States House of Representatives from Oklahoma
20th-century American politicians
United States Navy personnel of World War II